Itzhak Ben David (1931 – 1 June 2007) was an Israeli cyclist. He competed in the individual road race at the 1960 Summer Olympics.

References

External links
 

1931 births
2007 deaths
Israeli male cyclists
Moroccan emigrants to Israel
Olympic cyclists of Israel
Cyclists at the 1960 Summer Olympics